Omiodes odontosticta is a species of moth in the family Crambidae. It was first described by George Hampson in 1898 and is found Australia in Northern Territory and Queensland. 

The wingspan is about 30 mm.

External links

odontosticta
Moths described in 1898